Burpengary railway station is located on the North Coast line in Queensland, Australia. It serves the suburb of Burpengary in the Moreton Bay Region.

Services
Burpengary station is served by all City network services from Nambour and Caboolture to Central, many continuing to Springfield Central, Ipswich and Rosewood.

Services by platform

Transport Links
Kangaroo Bus Lines operate one route to and from Burpengary station:
664: Burpengary loop service

References

External links

Burpengary station Queensland Rail
Burpengary station Queensland's Railways on the Internet

Railway stations in Moreton Bay Region
North Coast railway line, Queensland